McBean is an unincorporated community in Richmond County, in the U.S. state of Georgia.

History
The community takes its name from nearby McBean Creek. A variant name is "McBean Depot". A post office was established at McBean in 1846, and remained in operation until 1962.

References

Unincorporated communities in Richmond County, Georgia
Unincorporated communities in Georgia (U.S. state)